Overton High School may refer to:

Overton High School (Nebraska) in Overton, Nebraska
Overton High School (Tennessee) in Memphis, Tennessee
Overton High School (Texas) in Overton, Texas
 John Overton High School in Nashville, Tennessee